Eric Fitzgerald Rupe (born June 14, 1963) is an American professional bicycle motocross (BMX) racer. His prime competitive years were from 1978 to 1990.

Considered one of the most underrated BMXers in its history, he also had one of the longest careers in BMX. He nominally retired from Senior pro racing after the 1990 American Bicycle Association Grand National but would go on to participate in Pro BMX competition on a serious basis for another 11 years, albeit in Masters/Veteran pro class, the class for racers past their peak competitive years, much like the Champions Tour (formally called the Senior PGA Tour) in golf. He was given the term "Big Daddy" at a 1988 Rockford ABA race by the announcer Dugan Finnel. He used the phrase “Big Daddy coming out on fire” for his win in Senior pro that day. He specifically called him that because he knew Eric was a father by then with a few children at home. Eric was one of the first racers to become a family man when he had his first child in 1984 (albeit Greg Hill became a father in late 1983) His clean-cut born again Christian lifestyle and philosophy lent greatly to the family man image. Over thirty-four years after his first race he was still racing professionally in the ABA Veteran pro class until recently. Today, he races in the Amateur 45 and Over cruiser class. However, he still is very competitive, winning the USA Cycling BMX National Championship in that class on March 21, 2009.

Racing career milestones

Note: All first in Pro Class are on the national level unless otherwise noted.

Retired (nominally): After 1990 ABA Grand National age 26. It was according to Eric a forced retirement due to the unsatisfactory contracts that were offered him by Mongoose. He even made a formal announcement prior in the September 1990 issue of American BMXer, the American Bicycle Association's newspaper in a letter dated July 24, 1990. However, while he may have retired from the points chasing top pro circuits that contends for no 1 Pro for the year, racing was not out of his system. Like a lot of retired BMX racers who come back and race a national or two for old time's sake and to keep a thumb in the pie, Rupe raced occasionally after his retirement. His post-"retirement" racing was one of the more active. After about 11 months of "retirement" he raced in the October 26–27, 1991 ABA Fall Nationals along with fellow retirees Stu Thomsen and Harry Leary. He had himself reclassified as an "A" pro and came in second to Eric Carter in that division as well as third in Pro Cruiser on Saturday and a fourth in Pro Cruiser on Sunday. In the ABA Grand National of that year he raced and won the Pro Cruiser Class. Most returning pros did it mostly for fun but Rupe had a serious cant to his "semi-retirement". He raced in the 1991 ABA Grand National on December 1, getting a first place in Pro Cruiser. Beginning in 1995, he would race and totally dominate in the mid and late 1990s and early 2000s the ABA Veteran Pro Cruiser class and win the 2000 and 2004 NBL Masters class no. 1 plate. He was still racing seriously in the ABA's Veteran Pro and NBL's Master classes as of 2006. He is 43 years old.

*At the time there was no separate pro class for pros due to the relatively small number of pros. They raced with the 16 Experts, making it a Pro/Am class essentially. This is why during the early years of the pro division the national number one racer of a sanctioning body could be either an amateur or professional. This practice continued until the NBA's 1979 season in which the pros earned separate pro points and a separate pro plate from the amateurs. The NBL and ABA followed suit a year later.
**During the era Eric Rupe turned pro, there wasn't a two-tier system of Junior and Senior pros.

Career factory and major bicycle shop sponsors

Note: This listing only denotes the racer's primary sponsors. At any given time a racer could have numerous co-sponsors. Primary sponsorships can be verified by BMX press coverage and sponsor's advertisements at the time in question.

Amateur
R & R (Rick Ankron & Rick Varner) Racing Products: February 1977-June 1977
Schwinn Bicycle Company: June 1977-November 1980 Eric turned pro with this sponsor.

Professional
Schwinn Bicycle Company: June 1977-November 1980 He left Schwinn when he got indications that he and his brother Robby Rupe were about to be dropped by them.
SE Racing (Formally Scot Enterprises, Now called Sports Engineering, Inc.): February 1981-November 1981. Left under unprofessional circumstances.
Mongoose (BMX Products): November 1981-February 1983.
Profile Competition Racing Products: February 1983-December 31, 1983.
Mongoose (BMX Products): January 1, 1984 – November 25, 1990. Retired nominally after the 1990 season due to Mongoose's drastic cut in his salary, from $25,000 a year to $3,000. During the 1990 season Eric was forced to get a normal job to support his family. This cut into his training and practice time significantly which in turn affected his performance at races negatively. Mongoose was going to cut his salary even more which what provoked his-as it turned out-brief retirement.
Haro Designs/Bicycles: October 1991-December 1992. By late 1991 his brief retirement was over. Following Ronnie Anderson's example in 1990, he had himself reclassified as an "A" pro in the ABA.
Pro Forx-GHP (Greg Hill Products): January 1993-
Parkpre Bicycles: 1995-June 1997.
Mongoose Bicycles (formerly BMX Products): June 1997-February 3, 2007. This was his third stint with Mongoose.
GT (Gary Turner) Bicycles: February 2007– 2012
Extreme Team:2013 - 2014 
Vendetta BMX:2015 - 2017 
Redline Bicycles: May 2018–Present

*Pros could race in the amateur classes at the time.

Career bicycle motocross titles

Note: Listed are district, State/Provincial/Department, regional, national, and international titles in italics. "Defunct" refers to the sanctioning body in question no longer existing at the start of the racer's career or at that stage of his/her career. Depending on point totals of individual racers, winners of Grand Nationals do not necessarily win National titles. Series and one-off Championships are also listed in block.

Amateur
National Bicycle Association (NBA)
1976 13 Expert Western States Champion
1977 Local #1 in 14 Expert
National Bicycle League (NBL)
None
American Bicycle Association (ABA)
None

Professional
National Bicycle Association (NBA)
None
National Bicycle League (NBL)
1980 National No.2 Pro
1983, 1984 National No.1 Pro
1985 National No.2 Pro
1986 Pro Cruiser National No.2
1987, 1988 National No.1 Pro Cruiser
1989 Pro Cruiser Grandnational Champion
1995 National No.1 Vet Pro
1996 NBL Legends Grandnational Champion
2000 National No.1 Masters Pro
2000 "A"* Pro National No.1
2002 "A" Pro Cruiser Grandnational Champion
2002 "A" Pro Cruiser National No.1
2004 Master Elite Grandnational Champion
2004 National No.1 Masters Pro

*By 2000 the NBL would adapt ABA practice and designate "AA" pro as the Senior pro division and rename "B" pro/Super Class to "A" pro. In the 2004 season the pro designations would be Elite Men and Superclass

American Bicycle Association (ABA)
1982 "AA" Pro 2nd Place Jag World Champion (ABA sanctioned)
1984 National No.3 Pro
1987 Pro Cruiser U.S. Gold Cup West Champion
1987, 1988 National No.1 Pro Cruiser
1989 Pro Cruiser U.S. Gold Cup West Champion
1991 Pro Cruiser Grandnational Champion
1996 Veteran Pro Grandnational Champion
1995, '96, '97, '98, '99, 2000, '01 National No.1 Pro Veteran Cruiser
1997, '98 World Cup Vet Pro Champion
1998 World Cup Pro Cruiser Champion
1998 Veteran Pro Race of Champions (ROC) Champion
1999 Race Of Champions "A" Pro Champion
2001 Veteran Pro National No.1
2001 World Cup Veteran Pro World Champion
2002 "A" Pro National No.3 and Veteran Pro National No.2
2003 Veteran Pro Grandnational Champion
United States Bicycle Association (USBA)
1984 Unlimited Pro† Grandnational Champion
1984 National No.1 Pro
1986 Pro Cruiser Grandnational Champion
1986 Pro Cruiser National No.2

†"Unlimited Pro" was the USBA's term for its senior professional class. It was renamed "A" Pro in the following racing season.

International Bicycle Motocross Federation (IBMXF)
1987, 1989 Pro Cruiser World Champion
1987 Pro Cruiser Vision Street Wear World Cup* Champion

*The Vision Street Wear World Cup was the direct descendant of the Murry World Cup. Murray stopped sponsoring the World Cup after the fifth 1986 edition due to the failure of Murray of Ohio bicycle company and the NBL to come to an agreement about the sponsorship fee Murray would have had to pay the NBL. If Murray continued its sponsorship, the 1987 addition would have been the sixth (VI) in the series.

Union Cycliste Internationale (UCI)
2005, 2006, 2007 40-44 Cruiser World Champion.
USA Cycling BMX
2008 and 2009 45 and Over Men Cruiser National Champion

Notable accolades
Winner of the BMX Plus! 1985 Racer of the Year Award with 44% of the reader survey vote. Won a Honda Elite Motor Scooter. This was the first ever BMX Plus! Racer of the Year award.
1988 ABA Hall of Fame Inductee.

BMX product lines
1984 Mongoose Eric Rupe Signature Edition Frame Set.
Product Evaluations:
BMX Plus! February 1985 Vol.8 No.2 pg.24 Official BMX Plus! test article.
BMX Action August 1985 Vol.10 No.8 pg.56 Official BMX Action test article.
2002 Mongoose "Eric Rupe" Signature Frame
Product Evaluations:

Racing habits and traits
For whatever reason, Eric Rupe had rarely raced ABA since its inception in 1977 until January 1984. In fact until the GT Supernationals held on January 27, 1984 in Burbank, California it was only the fourth ABA national he ever attended. He happened to double, winning "AA" and Pro Open class at that one, his first ABA national wins as an amateur or professional.

Miscellaneous
In 1977 he was a stunt double doing stunts on a bicycle for the character Riff in the TV show Loser Takes All. In this sense stunt riding does not mean freestyle, but doing perceived difficult high speed maneuvers on a bicycle and/or staged falls.
He got married on June 2, 1983 to Kathryn H. Meleski (he proposed in February 1983).
Eric is the father of three boys: Eric Mathew Rupe, born on August 5, 1984; John David Rupe born on December 13, 1986; and Kevin Phyllip Rupe born on September 13, 1988.
Eric Rupe's elder brother Robert "Robby" Rupe, a respected racer in his own right, married Deana Tomac, John Tomac's sister. John Tomac, after having a notable but comparatively brief BMX pro career, would switch to mountain bike racing (MTB) and would become one of that sport's most respected racers.
 Rupe is a born-again Christian. Also Rupe had a love of golf and video games almost the equal of his love of racing.

Significant injuries
Tore ligaments in ankle at the NBL Memphis National on March 31, 1985. His first race back was at the USBA San Antonio Nationals in San Antonio, Texas on May 4, 1985 after being laid up for five weeks.
Badly injured left knee on November 3, 1985 at the ABA Lake Elsinore Fall Nationals race. Laid up for four and one half months. His first race back was the 1986 NBL race in Memphis, Tennessee. In Rupe's recount of this injury, he believes it happened in 1986 but he is in error.
Crashed in the main at the NBL Easter Classic in Sarasota, Florida on April 11, 2004, breaking his wrist, specifically fracturing his scaphoid bone. He tore a few pectoral muscles as well. He was laid up until the ABA Rockford, Illinois National. This was his first broken bone he received from his 30 years of racing up to that time, although this was not the first time he was badly injured as the previous two times show.
He suffered severe facial and head injuries in a crash on the second straight at the ABA Silver Dollar Nationals in Reno, Nevada on January 11, 2008. He had a broken eye socket, cheekbone and temple bone. He had surgery on January 21, 2008 to insert Ti plates in his head to keep the bones in place as they heal. He was expected to be laid up a month. His first race back was the 2008 USA Cycling BMX National Championships in Desoto, Texas on March 28, 2008 in 45 and over Cruiser.

BMX and general press magazine interviews and articles
"Eric Rupe" BMX Plus! January 1982 Vol.5 No.1 pg.20
"Top Pros Speak Out" BMX Action April 1982 Vol.7 No.4 pg.62 Joint interview with Stu Thomsen, Greg Hill, Kevin McNeal, Harry Leary, Brent Patterson, and Scott Clark, speaking about various issues facing the racing world.
An Eric Rupe side bar. BMX Action August 1982 Vol.7 No.8 pg.40
"Eric Rupe: A New National Number One Pro." Super BMX January 1984 Vol.11 No.1 pg.70
"Eric Rupe" BMX Action March 1984 Vol.9 No.3 pg.42
"Devonshire" BMX Action July 1984 Vol.9 No.7 pg.31. One of eight mini-interviews with other racers held during the 1984 Devonshire Downs NBL race.
"Eric Rupe on...Turning Losses Into Wins" Super BMX September 1984 Vol.7 No.9 pg.38
"Moto-Notes: Jawin' With Eric Rupe" BMX Action December 1984 Vol.9 No.12 pg.60
"My Road To The NBL #1 Pro Plate" Super BMX & Freestyle June 1985 Vo1.12 No.6 pg.34 Story written by Eric Rupe.
"Eric Rupe's Advice for Young Riders" Rad Gallery Spectacular July 1985 pg.28 A one-off issue published by Daisy Hi-Torque, the publishers of BMX Plus! magazine
"The Champs: Eric Rupe" BMX Plus! April 1988 Vol.11 No.4 pg.40 One of six mini articles of the six ABA National No.1 winners of 1987.
"Cook with Eric Rupe" BMX Action March 1988 Vol.13 No.3 pg.62
Gold Cup West mini interview. American BMXer November 1989 Vol.11 No.10 pg.17 Very brief interview taken after win.
"The Big Daddy of BMX" BMX Plus! April 1991 Vol.14 No.4 pg.24
"BMXer For Life: The Life and Times of the 'Big Daddy'" Snap BMX Magazine June 1998 Vol.4 Iss.4 No.23 pg.80 Autobiographical article by Eric Rupe.
"Eric Rupe: 32 years To Life Behind Bars" BMX World Magazine April/May 2006 Vol.1 Iss.3 pg.52 Very large article of the career of Eric Rupe. Foreword written by his brother Robby Rupe.
Masters Cycling Summer 2008 A magazine targeting the older Cyclist. It featured Eric Rupe's BMX career in the older BMX classes.

BMX magazine covers

Note: Only magazines that were in publication at the time of the racer's careers are listed, unless specifically noted.

Bicycle Motocross News:
None
Minicycle/BMX Action & Super BMX:
Super BMX Presents The 1985 World Championship Winter 1985. In fourth with #"1" on his helmet to Harry Leary's (85) behind/left. Leary is in the rear foreground in second to Gary Ellis's (47) in the lead. Brian Patterson is to Ellis's rear left in third. Also two unidentifieds (SBMX special edition).
January 1988 Vol.15 No.1 (5) behind Gary Ellis (6). In inset Freestyler Denny Howell.(SBMX&F)
Bicycle Motocross Action & Go:
July 1985 Vol.10 No.7 in insert with Mike Miranda following. Brad Birdwell main image.
July 1987 Vol.12 No.7 (BMXA)
BMX Plus!:
January 1983 Vol.6 No.1
June 1984 Vol.7 No.6 main image. In insert Stu Thomsen.
December 1984 Vol.7 No.12 (22) in insert with Clearance Perry (20) (top center). In other inserts Pete Loncarevich (73) & Anthony Sewell (13) (bottom center); freestylers Mike Dominguez (top left); Woody Itson (top right); Rick Avella (bottom left); Ron Wilkerson with Shawn Buckley clowning around.
February 1985 Vol.8 No.2 in insert. Main image: Toby Henderson.
April 1985 Vol.8 No.4 main image. In insert Harry Leary (2) & Eddy King (5).
September 1986 Vol.9 No.9 in photo composite behind Greg Hill (1), Tommy Brackens and ahead of Gary Ellis (1) and unidentified (15). Freestyler Eddie Fiola "above" them.
October 1986 Vol.9 No.10 In bottom insert (2) behind Pete Loncarevich (3) ahead of, Eddy King (6.) In upper insert Robby Rupe, Scott Towne, Billy Griggs, Dave Cullinan & Tim Ebbett. Main image Todd Anderson.
November 1987 Vol.10 No.11 (5) with teammate Travis Chipres (8) following.
Total BMX:

Bicycles and Dirt (ABA publication):
August 1984 Vol.2 No.9 (33) In insert behind Bart McDaniel (17), and ahead of Harry Leary (Diamondback). Racer Tim Judge and Freestyler Woody Itson in main image.
Snap BMX Magazine & TransWorld BMX:
None
Moto Mag:
None
BMX World:

NBA World & NBmxA World (The official NBA/NBmxA membership publication):

Bicycles Today & BMX Today (The official NBL membership publication under two names):

ABA Action, American BMXer, BMXer (The official ABA membership publication under three names):
ABA Action March 1984 Vol.7 No.2 in the center with Robert Fehd on the right and unidentified racer to the left.
USBA Racer (The official USBA membership publication):

Specials:
Masters Cycling Summer 2008. A Cycling magazine aimed at the older cycling enthusiast.

Notes

External links
 Short biography on the Mongoose Bicycles website
 BMXaction Special interview with Eric Rupe
 A brief photo montage of Eric Rupe's career BMX Racing News, Monday, December 6, 2004
 The American Bicycle Association (ABA) website
 The National Bicycle League (NBL) website

1963 births
American male cyclists
BMX riders
Living people
People from Reseda, Los Angeles
Cyclists from Los Angeles